List of companies formerly listed on the Oslo Stock Exchange, by date of delisting.

See also
List of companies listed on the Oslo Stock Exchange

References

Delisted
Oslo Stock Exchange